The former company Grasso is part of GEA Group since 1991. GEA's energy efficient and sustainable technologies - including industrial refrigeration, gas compression, separation and emission reduction - span all industries served by GEA.

References

External links
https://www.gea.com/industrialrefrigeration

Manufacturing companies of the Netherlands